The Falcon Out West (aka The Falcon in Texas) is a 1944 American mystery film directed by William Clemens and starring Tom Conway, Joan Barclay and Barbara Hale. The film was part of RKO's The Falcon series of detective films, this time, a murder set in Texas.

Plot
When Mrs. Irwin (Joan Barclay), asks Tom Lawrence (Tom Conway), aka the Falcon, to prevent the marriage of her ex-husband, Tex Irwin (Lyle Talbot) to his fiancée, gold digger Vanessa Drake (Carole Gallagher), The Falcon becomes involved in murder. Rich cattle baron Irwin is murdered in a New York City nightclub, dying from the venom of a rattlesnake.  When suspicion falls on various members of his family and business associates, The Falcon and the police, led by Police Inspector Timothy Donovan (Cliff Clark) and his assistant, Homicide Detective Bates (Edward Gargan) travel west following Vanessa, to the Irwin ranch in Texas to try and solve the mystery.

At the ranch, when Lawrence is out riding, someone takes a pot shot at him and when Tex's lawyer Steven Hayden (Donald Douglas) is killed in the same way that Tex died, a snake bite, there are many suspicious individuals to consider. Dusty, Tex's foreman was in the nightclub when Tex had died. Tex's partner, Dave Colby (Minor Watson) and his daughter Marion (Barbara Hale) and Vanessa, and Mrs. Irwin, who turns up at the ranch, are all suspect. An Indian scalp is hung on Lawrence's door as a Comanche death warning for him not to go on with the investigation.

An apparent attack on Vanessa complicates matters. With Mrs. Irwin and the Colbys trying to stop her marriage, the police focus on Colby as the main suspect, but the Falcon is not sure. When Lawrence finds an Indian medicine bag containing the deed to Tex's ranch and a poison ring in the shape of a snake, he knows how the murders were committed.

Confronting Vanessa, she tries to use a poison ring to stab Lawrence but Dusty intervenes, pulling a gun on the Falcon. Dusty had been Vanessa's love interest and now reveals himself as her accomplice in murder. Colby's ranch hands and the police surround the house forcing the two killers to surrender.

At the train station, Tom and Marion watch Donovan and Bates board their train when a beautiful woman steps from the train and asks for help.

Cast

 Tom Conway as Tom Lawrence, aka the Falcon 
 Carole Gallagher as Vanessa Drake  
 Barbara Hale as  Marion Colby  
 Joan Barclay as Mrs. Irwin  
 Cliff Clark as Police Inspector Timothy Donovan  
 Edward Gargan as Homicide Detective Bates 
 Minor Watson as Dave Colby  
 Donald Douglas as Attorney Steven Hayden 
 Lyle Talbot as Tex Irwin  
 Lee Trent as "Dusty"  
 Perc Launders as "Red"
 Wheaton Chambers as Sheriff
 Chief Thunderbird as Eagle Feather
 Tom Burton as Photographer
 Steve Winston as Cowboy
 Slim Whitaker as Cowboy
 Harry Clay as Hall
 Robert Andersen as Wally Waldron
 Edmund Glover as Frank Daley
 Mary Halsey as Cissy
 Daun Kennedy as Gloria
 Rosemary LaPlanche as Mary
 Chef Milani as Manager
 Elaine Riley as Cigarette girl
 Lawrence Tierney as Orchestra leader
 Shirley O'Hara as Hat check girl
 Patti Brill as Hat check girl
 Edward Clark as Coroner
 Joe Cody as Toni
 Bert Roach as Charlie
 Norman Willis as Callahan
 Kernan Cripps as Murphy
 William Nestell as Chef
 Zedra Conde as Carlita
 Norman Mayes as Pullman porter

Production
The working title of this film was "The Falcon in Texas" with principal photography taking place from October 4 to early November 1943.The Hollywood Reporter initially listed Richard Martin, Russell Wade, Bruce Edwards, Rita Corday, Margaret Landry, Dorothy Maloney and Barbara Lynn in the cast.

Reception
In his review of The Falcon Out West, Bosley Crowther wrote, in The New York Times, "Anything for variety—that seems to be the policy of RKO with reference to its gentleman sleuth, the Falcon, hero of a long series of films. Now, for his latest adventure, flatly titled 'The Falcon Out West' —just so none of the customers is likely to be confused—the producers have meshed a whodunnit with Western atmosphere. The result is schematically novel; in other respects, it is old, familiar stuff. ... in the wide open spaces, where crooners and stock Indians roam, the Falcon goes through his old routine of spotting the guilty one. Tom Conway is still the dapper Falcon, Carole Gallagher and Barbara Hale are girls in the case, and Cliff Clark and Ed Gargan are, as usual, the dumb, uncooperative cops."

Film historians Richard Jewell and Vernon Harbin described The Falcon Out West, as "... sleuthing with standard horse-opera clichés including ambushes, runaway stagecoaches and chase scenes." The problem with the film was that Tom Conway was no longer nonchalant, but simply, "bored". In a recent review of the Falcon series for the Time Out Film Guide, Tom Milne wrote, "Conway, bringing a lighter touch to the series (which managed its comic relief better than most), starred in nine films after The Falcon's Brother, most of them deft and surprisingly enjoyable."

See also
 List of American films of 1944

References

Notes

Citations

Bibliography

 Drew, Bernard A. Motion Picture Series and Sequels: A Reference Guide. London: Routledge, 2013. .
 Jewell, Richard and Vernon Harbin. The RKO Story. New Rochelle, New York: Arlington House, 1982. .
 Pym, John, ed. Time Out Film Guide. London: Time Out Guides Limited, 2004. .

External links
 
 
 
 

1944 films
American mystery films
American black-and-white films
1944 mystery films
Films scored by Roy Webb
Films directed by William Clemens
RKO Pictures films
Films set in New York City
Films set in Texas
Poisoning in film
The Falcon (film character) films
1940s English-language films
1940s American films